Hoploscopa astrapias is a moth in the family Crambidae. It is found on Fiji.

References

Moths described in 1886
Hoploscopini